Number 19 Squadron (sometimes written as No. XIX Squadron) is a squadron of the Royal Air Force. It was the first squadron to operate the Supermarine Spitfire. It currently operates the UK's Control and Reporting Centre from RAF Boulmer. No. 19 Squadron delivers persistent surveillance of UK airspace, and Tactical Control of RAF and NATO aircraft, including the UK's contribution to NATO's Quick Reaction Alert mission.

Formed on 1 September 1915 as a Royal Flying Corps squadron, the unit served during the First World War. No. 19 Squadron was the first squadron to operate the Supermarine Spitfire, which it flew for the majority of the Second World War. The squadron operated several different types during the Cold War from the Gloster Meteor F.4 to the McDonnell Douglas Phantom FGR.2 as No. 19 (Fighter) Squadron. In 1992, and on receipt of the BAe Hawk and establishing at RAF Valley, the squadron was designated as No. 19 (Reserve) Squadron.

The squadron was disbanded on 24 November 2011, before being allocated to the UK Air Surveillance and Control System Control and Reporting Centre at RAF Boulmer on 1 April 2021, charged with providing Battle Management and Tactical Command and Control (Tac C2) of NATO aircraft, for both defence of the UK and NATO airspace, as well as operational training for the RAF's fast jet squadrons.

History

First World War
No. 19 Squadron of the Royal Flying Corps was formed on 1 September 1915, from members of No. 5 Squadron, at Castle Bromwich training on a variety of aircraft before being deployed to France in July 1916 flying Royal Aircraft Factory B.E.12 and re-equipping with the more suitable French-built SPAD S.VIIs.

From November 1917, the squadron started to receive Sopwith Dolphins to replace its Spads, it being fully equipped with the Dolphin during January 1918, flying its first operational patrol with the new fighter on 3 February. By the end of the war, No. 19 Squadron had had 22 flying aces among its ranks, including Albert Desbrisay Carter, John Leacroft, Arthur Bradfield Fairclough, Oliver Bryson, Gordon Budd Irving, Frederick Sowrey, future Air Commodore Patrick Huskinson, Cecil Gardner, Roger Amedee Del'Haye, future Air Chief Marshal James Hardman, Finlay McQuistan, Alexander Pentland, John Candy, Cecil Thompson and John Aldridge.

Commanding officers during this time included H.D. Harvey-Kelly who was the first RFC pilot to land in France in the First World War. At least one of the No. 19 Squadron airmen, a Canadian, George Robert Long, was captured on 6 October 1917 in the Lille area and spent the rest of the war in a number of prisoner of war camps, including Holzminden prisoner-of-war camp. It was his very first flight, in a Spad VII, B3508. The squadron was flying out of Bailleul (Asylum Ground) at the time. He was shot down by Gefreiter J. Funk, flying with Ja30. He had first been a member of the C.E.F. in the infantry and was wounded a number of times. He wasn't repatriated until 14 December 1918, to return home to Ottawa, Ontario, Canada.

Interwar period

No. 19 Squadron was disbanded after the First World War on 31 December 1919. On 1 April 1923, the squadron was reformed at RAF Duxford with the Sopwith Snipe, initially operating as part of No. 2 Flying Training School (No. 2 FTS). After becoming independent No. 2 FTS, No. 19 Squadron remained at Duxford flying number of different fighters such as the Gloster Grebe, Armstrong Whitworth Siskin Mk.IIIa and the Bristol Bulldog Mk.IIa. In May 1935, the unit became the first squadron to be equipped with the Gloster Gauntlet which they flew until March 1939. In 1938, No. 19 Squadron became the first squadron in the RAF to operate the Supermarine Spitfire Mk.I, when  K9789 was delivered on 4 August. The squadron lost its first Spitfire when K9792 crashed on landing at RAF Duxford on 20 September 1938, having only been delivered on 16 August.

Second World War
No. 19 Squadron was stationed at RAF Duxford after the outbreak of the Second World War in September 1939, and was part of No. 12 Group, RAF Fighter Command. Douglas Bader was posted to the squadron in February 1940. In May and June 1940, the squadron helped provide air cover over the Dunkirk beaches. In June 1940, No. 19 Squadron began the receive Spitfire Mk.Ibs, which were armed with the Hispano cannon, however due to reliability issues the unit soon reverted to the Spitfire Mk.Ia.  No. 19 Squadron formed part of the Duxford Wing, No. 12 Group's 'Big Wing' formation during the Battle of Britain.

Later versions of Spitfires were flown until the arrival of North American Mustang Mk.IIIs for close-support duties in early 1944. After D-Day, No. 19 Squadron briefly went across the English Channel before starting long-range escort duties from RAF Peterhead, Scotland, for Coastal Command off the coast of Norway. The Squadron converted to the Mustang Mk.IV in April 1945 while based at RAF Peterhead.

Cold War

Relocating south to RAF Acklington on 13 May 1945, No. XIX (Fighter) Squadron exchanged their Mustangs for Spitfire Mk.XVIs. While at RAF Wittering in October 1946, No. 19 (F) Squadron converted to the de Havilland Hornet Mk.I which were operated until January 1951 when the Squadron received their first jet aircraft – the Gloster Meteor F.4. These were soon exchanged for the Meteor F.8 in April 1951 which were flown until October 1956 when No. 19 (F) Squadron received the Hawker Hunter F.6. The Squadron moved to RAF Leconfield, Yorkshire in 1959 where they converted to the English Electric Lightning F.2 in November 1962.

The Squadron and her sister unit, No. 92 (F) Squadron, were deployed forwards in September 1965 to RAF Gütersloh, close to the inner German border, as part of Second Allied Tactical Air Force (2ATAF). Subsequently, the squadron re-equipped with the longer-range Lightning F.2A version.

On 31 December 1976, No. 19 (F) Squadron disbanded with the Lightning, followed by No. 92 (F) Squadron in March 1977, and reformed the next day at RAF Wildenrath, further back west of the Rhine, with the McDonnell Douglas Phantom FGR.2 still in the air defence role.

Because of restricted airspace in then West Germany, both No. 19 Squadron and its sister No. 92 Squadron deployed regularly out of theatre over these years for annual Missile Practice Camps at RAF Valley, using the Aberporth Range in Wales, to RAF St Mawgan in Cornwall and RAF Akrotiri in Cyprus for Armament Practice Camps (gunnery), to Italian Air Force Decimommanu in Sardinia to use the NATO Air Combat Manoeuvring Instrumented Range, and latterly to Eglin and Nellis Air Force Bases in Florida and Nevada to participate respectively in multi national Exercises Green and Red Flags.

On 17 August 1990, No. XIX (F) Squadron, along with No. 92 (F) Squadron, were sent to RAF Akrotiri, Cyprus, in order to provide air defence for the island after Tornado F.3s from No. V (AC) Squadron and No. 29 (F) Squadron deployed from Akrotiri to Dhahran Airfield due to the Iraqi Invasion of Kuwait (ahead of Operation Granby). No. 19 (F) Squadron operated their Phantoms from here until 28 February 1991 when a ceasefire was called between the coalition forces and Iraq.

On 9 January 1992, the squadron disbanded as part of agreed post-Cold War force reductions and their aircraft were scrapped.

Hawk (1992–2011)

The number plate was then assigned to the former No. 63 Squadron, one of the Hawk squadrons at RAF Chivenor, in September 1992, becoming No. 19 (Reserve) Squadron. The squadron was a 'Shadow' identity of No. 2 Tactical Weapons Unit (2 TWU). Following the closure of Chivenor to jet flying the squadron was moved to RAF Valley in September 1994 to provide advanced fast jet training on the BAE Hawk.

As a consequence of the UK's Strategic Defence and Security Review in 2010, the Air Force Board decided in 2011 that 19 Squadron's training role with the Hawk T2 at RAF Valley should be transferred to a resurrected No. 4(R) Squadron. No. 19(R) Squadron, one of the last surviving Battle of Britain squadrons, disbanded on 24 November 2011, 96 years after it was first formed.

The disbandment event, held at RAF Valley, was led by Officer Commanding No. 19 Squadron, Wing Commander Kevin Marsh. In attendance were the Chief of Air Staff, Air Chief Marshal Stephen Dalton, Air Chief Marshal William Wratten and Flight Lieutenant Ken Wilkinson - a 19 Squadron Spitfire pilot who flew during the Battle of Britain.

Control and Reporting Centre (2021 – present) 
In 2021, the RAF recognised the important role of Battle Management and Air Traffic Control units had played in defence of the UK and NATO over the cold war and in the UK's response since the 9/11 terrorist attacks. The RAF awarded squadron number plates to Battlespace Management Operations Wing, the Air Surveillance and Control System (ASACS) Operational Conversion Unit (OCU), and RAF Swanwick. Battlespace Management Operations Wing, including the remnants of No. 1 Air Control Centre, was re-brigaded as No. 19 Squadron on 1 April 2021, and continues to operate the Control and Reporting Centre from RAF Boulmer in Northumberland. 

No. 19 Squadron's reformation was celebrated officially at a reformation parade on 15 June 2021, held at Alnwick Castle. The parade was led by RAF Boulmer Station Commander, Group Captain David Keighley, Officer Commanding No. 19 Squadron, Wing Commander Chris Misiak, and Officer Commanding No. 20 Squadron, Wing Commander Andy Foy.  In attendance were the Lord Lieutentant of Northumberland and Chief of Staff Capability, Air Vice Marshall Lincoln Taylor. 

No. 19 Squadron operate the Control and Reporting Centre, considered to be the modern-day translation of Dowding's eponymous Integrated Air Defence System, credited with ultimate success during the Battle of Britain by allowing Fighter Command to position and mass air defence fighters where they were needed most. 

The CRC weapon system is a system-of-systems designed to give operators situational awareness over a given battlespace, and also giving those same operators the means to direct, communicate, guide and advise military aircraft to achieve their mission. No. 19 Squadron are providers of Tactical-level Command and Control and are considered a Tac C2 agency within NATO.

Alongside No. 20 Squadron, No. 19 Squadron continues to defend the UK. No. 20 Squadron provide expert training to the air battle managers of No. 19 Squadron, including initial qualification, Combat Ready training, and the Qualified Weapons Instructor (Command and Control) course.

Aircraft operated

See also
List of Royal Air Force aircraft squadrons

References
Notes

Bibliography

 Bowyer, Michael J.F. and John D.R. Rawlings. Squadron Codes, 1937-56. Bar Hill, Cambridgeshire, UK: Patrick Stephens Ltd., 1979. .
 Chorlton, Martyn. "The Determined Dolphins". Aeroplane, Autumn 2014, Vol. 42, No. 9. pp. 58–62. ISSN 0143-7240.
 Delve, Ken. The Source Book of the RAF. Shrewsbury, Shropshire, UK: Airlife Publishing, 1994. .
 Flintham, Vic and Andrew Thomas. Combat Codes: A Full Explanation and Listing of British, Commonwealth and Allied Air Force Unit Codes since 1938. Shrewsbury, Shropshire, UK: Airlife Publishing Ltd., 2003. .
 Halley, James J. The Squadrons of the Royal Air Force & Commonwealth, 1918-1988. Tonbridge, Kent, UK: Air-Britain (Historians) Ltd., 1988. .
 Jefford, C.G. RAF Squadrons, a Comprehensive Record of the Movement and Equipment of all RAF Squadrons and their Antecedents since 1912. Shrewsbury, Shropshire, UK: Airlife Publishing, 1988 (second edition 2001). .
 Palmer, Derek. Fighter Squadron (No. 19). Upton-upon-Severn, Worcestershire, UK: Self Publishing Association, 1991. .
 Palmer, Derek. 19 Fighter Squadron, RAF. Published by Derek Palmer, 2008. .
 Rawlings, John D.R. Fighter Squadrons of the Royal Air Force and their Aircraft. London: MacDonald and Jane's (Publishers) Ltd., 1969 (new edition 1976, reprinted 1978). . pp. 47–54.

External links

 Royal Air Force: 19 Squadron
 Archived Site Royal Air Force: 19 Squadron
 19(F) Squadron All Ranks Association

019
019 Squadron
Military units and formations established in 1915
Military units and formations of the Royal Air Force in World War I
No. 19
RAF squadrons involved in the Battle of Britain
1915 establishments in the United Kingdom
Military units and formations disestablished in 2011